The Federal Building and U.S. Courthouse, also known as U.S. Post Office and Court House, is a historic government building in Dothan, Alabama.

Architecture and history
The Classical Revival building was begun in 1909 and completed in 1911 to designs by architects and engineers in the Office of the Supervising Architect under James Knox Taylor. It was built to house facilities of the United States District Court for the Middle District of Alabama, the United States Post Office and other federal agencies. In 1952 a plain one-story addition was added in the rear of the building, and in 1962 the post office moved to a new facility. The building is still used as a courthouse.

It was listed on the National Register of Historic Places in 1974.

See also 

List of United States federal courthouses in Alabama
List of United States post offices

References 

Neoclassical architecture in Alabama
Federal buildings in the United States
Government buildings completed in 1911
Dothan
Buildings and structures in Dothan, Alabama
Courthouses in Alabama
Courthouses on the National Register of Historic Places in Alabama
National Register of Historic Places in Houston County, Alabama
1911 establishments in Alabama